Dane Prairie Township is a township in Otter Tail County, Minnesota, United States. The population was 892 at the 2000 census.

Dane Prairie Township was organized in 1870, and named for its prairies originally settled chiefly by natives of Denmark.

Geography

Demographics
As of the census of 2000, there were 892 people, 359 households, and 282 families residing in the township. There were 479 housing units at an average density of 15.3/sq mi (5.9/km2). The racial makeup of the township was 99.22% White, 0.11% African American, 0.45% Asian, and 0.22% from two or more races.

There were 359 households, out of which 29.0% had children under the age of 18 living with them, 74.1% were married couples living together, 2.2% had a female householder with no husband present, and 21.4% were non-families. 18.4% of all households were made up of individuals, and 6.7% had someone living alone who was 65 years of age or older.  The average household size was 2.48 and the average family size was 2.85.

In the township the population was spread out, with 22.5% under the age of 18, 4.9% from 18 to 24, 24.2% from 25 to 44, 33.7% from 45 to 64, and 14.6% who were 65 years of age or older.  The median age was 44 years. For every 100 females, there were 105.1 males.  For every 100 females age 18 and over, there were 106.9 males.

The median income for a household in the township was $47,232, and the median income for a family was $52,426. Males had a median income of $34,750 versus $23,611 for females. The per capita income for the township was $22,630.  About 1.1% of families and 3.2% of the population were below the poverty line, including none of those under age 18 and 13.5% of those age 65 or over.

References

Townships in Otter Tail County, Minnesota
Townships in Minnesota